Roger Andrew Harper (born 17 March 1963) is a Guyanese former cricketer turned coach, who played both Test and One Day International cricket for the West Indies cricket team. His international career lasted 13 years, from 1983 to 1996, and he was later described as a "fabulous" fielder.

His Test bowling average of 28.06 is superior to that of Lance Gibbs, giving him the leading average among all West Indian spinners with at least 25 Test wickets. One of his most notable performances was against South Africa in the Quarter Finals of the 1996 Cricket World Cup when he took 4/47 to allow the West Indies to seize control of the match.

Harper was an all-rounder who batted right-handed and bowled right-arm off breaks, although suffering from the yips during part of his career. As a player, he recorded 535 runs and 46 wickets in his 25 Tests, and he played 200 first class matches. As a player he made many of his best performances in England. His Test batting and bowling averages in England were better than his averages elsewhere, he recorded both his best Test bowling figures of 6/57 and his highest test score (74) against England at Old Trafford, respectively in 1984 and 1988, and he made his highest first-class score of 234 while playing for Northamptonshire (while batting at no.7) against Gloucestershire in 1986. It was in England (at Lord's) that he also pulled off his most famous piece of fielding to run out Graham Gooch during the MCC Bicentenary match in 1987.

After his playing career, he became a coach, taking over the West Indies team between 2000 and 2003, and then team manager of the West Indies Under-19 cricket team in 2005. However, he was approached by Cricket Kenya in late December 2005 with an offer of taking over the Kenyan national team after interim coach Mudassar Nazar, and the appointment was made official in January 2006. Harper said it "was great to be back" coaching players "at a relatively high level."

References

1963 births
Living people
Sportspeople from Georgetown, Guyana
Guyanese cricketers
Demerara cricketers
Northamptonshire cricketers
West Indies One Day International cricketers
West Indies Test cricketers
West Indian cricket captains
Guyanese cricket coaches
Guyana cricketers
Afro-Guyanese people
Coaches of the Kenya national cricket team
Cricketers at the 1987 Cricket World Cup
Cricketers at the 1992 Cricket World Cup
Cricketers at the 1996 Cricket World Cup
Caribbean Premier League coaches
Coaches of the United States national cricket team
M Parkinson's World XI cricketers
Scarborough Festival President's XI cricketers
D. B. Close's XI cricketers